Wayne Lavern Robinson (January 14, 1930 – December 20, 2015) was a professional American football linebacker in the National Football League for the Philadelphia Eagles from 1952 through 1956.  He played college football at the University of Minnesota and was drafted by the Eagles in the eighth round of the 1952 NFL Draft.  He was selected to the Pro Bowl in 1954 and 1955.

After his playing career, he coached in the Canadian Football League for the Winnipeg Blue Bombers and the British Columbia Lions.  He also coached at the University of Iowa, for the Houston Oilers, Green Bay Packers and the Atlanta Falcons before finally retiring in 1976.

He was named to the Philadelphia Eagles Top 75 players in franchise history in 2007 celebrating the team's 75th anniversary.  He ranked at number 44. He died on December 20, 2015 in San Diego at the age of 85.

References

1930 births
2015 deaths
American football linebackers
Atlanta Falcons coaches
BC Lions coaches
Green Bay Packers coaches
Iowa Hawkeyes football coaches
Houston Oilers coaches
Minnesota Golden Gophers football players
Philadelphia Eagles players
Winnipeg Blue Bombers coaches
Eastern Conference Pro Bowl players
Sports coaches from Minneapolis
Players of American football from Minneapolis
Educators from Minnesota